The 1978 Swiss Indoors was a men's tennis tournament played on indoor hard courts at the St. Jakobshalle in Basel, Switzerland that was part of the 1978 Colgate-Palmolive Grand Prix. It was the 10th edition of the tournament and was held from 24 October through 29 October 1978. First-seeded Guillermo Vilas won the singles title.

Finals

Singles
 Guillermo Vilas defeated  John McEnroe 6–3, 5–7, 7–5, 6–4
 It was Vilas' 6th singles title of the year and the 41st of his career.

Doubles
 John McEnroe /  Wojciech Fibak defeated  Bruce Manson /  Andrew Pattison 7–6, 7–5

References

External links
 Official website 
 ITF tournament edition details

Swiss Indoors
Swiss Indoors
indoor